At the 1936 Summer Olympics in Berlin, a single modern pentathlon event was contested.

Medalists

Participating nations

A total of 42 athletes from 16 nations competed at the Berlin Games:

Results
The method of scoring was point-for-place.  First place received one point, second place received two, and so on.  The athlete with the fewest points won the event.

Riding

Fencing

Each athlete participated in a round-robin épée tournament.  Each match lasted one minute, and the first athlete to score a hit won.

Shooting
Each athlete shot 20 shots with a rapid-fire pistol.

Swimming
Each athlete raced in a 300-meter freestyle event.

Running
Each athlete ran a 4000-meter race.

Final standings

References

External links
 

1936 Summer Olympics events
1936
Men's events at the 1936 Summer Olympics